Bimalendu Singha Roy is an Indian teacher and politician from West Bengal belonging to All India Trinamool Congress. He is a member of the West Bengal Legislative Assembly.

Biography
Roy was born in 1958. He graduated from Krishnagar Government College in English. He completed postgraduate studies in English from Kalyani University in 1982.

Roy joined Muragachha High School in 1985. He became the headmaster of this institution in 2000. He retired from his job in 2016.

Roy received Shiksharatna from West Bengal Government in 2013. He received Rashtrapati Award in 2017.

Roy was elected as a member of the West Bengal Legislative Assembly from Karimpur on 28 November 2019.

References

Living people
West Bengal MLAs 2016–2021
Trinamool Congress politicians from West Bengal
Indian schoolteachers
People from Nadia district
1958 births
University of Kalyani alumni